James Meehan (July 7, 1834 - April 9, 1920) was an American lumberman from Meehan, Wisconsin who served one term as a "Greenback Democrat" member of the Wisconsin State Assembly from Portage County, Wisconsin.

Background 
Meehan was born July 7, 1834 in the Parish of Ste. Catherine in Canada East. He received a common school education and became a lumberman. He moved to Wisconsin, first to Honey Creek in Sauk County, then to Grand Rapids, and finally in 1867 to the Town of Linwood in Portage County. He died on April 9, 1920 in Milwaukee, Wisconsin.

Public office 
From 1870 to 1877, Meehan was a member of the Portage County board of supervisors.

While he was elected to the Assembly in 1877 as a Greenbacker, unseating Republican incumbent William Arnott (there was no Democrat in the race), his official profile in the 1878 Wisconsin Blue Book lists him as a "Greenback Democrat". He was not a candidate for re-election in 1878, and was succeeded by former Assemblyman Thomas McDill, a Republican: there was no Greenbacker in the race, although there was a Democratic candidate).

It is unclear whether Meehan, Wisconsin was named after him or not.

References 

1834 births
American loggers
Pre-Confederation Canadian emigrants to the United States
County supervisors in Wisconsin
People from Montérégie
Wisconsin Greenbacks
19th-century American politicians
1920 deaths
People from Plover, Wisconsin
People from Honey Creek, Sauk County, Wisconsin
People from Grand Rapids, Wisconsin
People from Portage County, Wisconsin
Democratic Party members of the Wisconsin State Assembly